is a Japanese reality television series and the first installment of the Terrace House franchise. It follows three men and three women as they temporarily live together in a modernistic house with a terrace located in the Shōnan area of Japan. The cast moved from the first house to a second one beginning with season five in October 2013. The show aired on Fuji Television's "Cool TV" segment from October 12, 2012 to September 29, 2014 for eight seasons, after which the 2015 theatrical film Closing Door was released as a conclusion to the show.

Boys × Girls Next Door and the Closing Door film are the only iterations of the franchise produced solely by Fuji TV. Beginning with Boys & Girls in the City, the franchise has been co-produced by Fuji TV and Netflix and released internationally.

Cast

Timeline

Recurring guests

Episodes

Season 1 (2012–13)

Season 2 (2013)

Season 3 (2013)

Season 4 (2013)

Season 5 (2013–14)

Season 6 (2014)

Season 7 (2014)

Season 8 (2014)

Other media 
Two books related to Terrace House: Boys × Girls Next Door were released. Terrace House Inside was published on January 28, 2014 by Fusosha Publishing. Terrace House Premium was published on February 13, 2015 by Ohta Publishing, one day before the Closing Door film opened.

Five albums containing music used in the show were released between 2013 and 2014, some of which include songs by its cast members. Terrace House Covers ~Boys×Girls Love Somebody Songs~ was released on October 16, 2013 and charted at number 165 on the Oricon Albums Chart. Terrace House Tunes was released on May 21, 2014 by Universal Music and reached number 5. The Backgrounds of Terrace House was released on May 28, 2015 by Clutch Records. Terrace House Tunes - We Were Once in Love and Terrace House Tunes - We are Best Friends Forever were both released on October 6, 2014 and reached numbers 9 and 13 on the chart respectively.

References

External links 
 Fuji TV - Terrace House: Boys×Girls Next Door 
 Official Site - Terrace House: Boys×Girls Next Door 
 

Japanese reality television series
Fuji TV original programming